1862 Apollo  is a stony asteroid, approximately 1.5 kilometers in diameter, classified as a near-Earth object (NEO). It was discovered by German astronomer Karl Reinmuth at Heidelberg Observatory on 24 April 1932, but lost and not recovered until 1973.

It is the namesake and the first recognized member of the Apollo asteroids, a subgroup of NEOs which are Earth-crossers, that is, they cross the orbit of the Earth when viewed perpendicularly to the ecliptic plane (crossing an orbit is a more general term than actually intersecting it). In addition, since Apollo's orbit is highly eccentric, it crosses the orbits of Venus and Mars and is therefore called a Venus-crosser and Mars-crosser as well.

Although Apollo was the first Apollo asteroid to be discovered, its official IAU-number (1862) is higher than that of some other Apollo asteroids such as 1566 Icarus, due to the fact that it was a lost asteroid for more than 40 years and other bodies were numbered in the meantime. The analysis of its rotation provided observational evidence of the YORP effect.

It is named after the Greek god Apollo. He is the god of the Sun, child of Zeus and Leto, after which the minor planets 5731 Zeus and 68 Leto are named.

Satellite 
On November 4, 2005, it was announced that an asteroid moon, or satellite of Apollo, had been detected by radar observations from Arecibo Observatory, Puerto Rico, October 29 – November 2, 2005. The announcement is contained in the International Astronomical Union Circular (IAUC) 8627. From the surface of Apollo, S/2005 (1862) 1 would have an angular diameter of about 2.0835 degrees.

Potentially hazardous object 
1862 Apollo is a potentially hazardous asteroid (PHA) because its minimum orbit intersection distance (MOID) is less than 0.05 AU and its diameter is greater than 150 meters. Its orbit is well-determined for the next several hundred years. On 17 May 2075 it will pass  from Venus.

See also 
 Lost asteroid

Notes

References

External links 
 Lightcurve plot of 1862 Apollo, Palmer Divide Observatory, B. D. Warner (2005)
 Asteroids with Satellites, Robert Johnston, johnstonsarchive.net
 Asteroid Lightcurve Database (LCDB), query form (info )
 Dictionary of Minor Planet Names, Google books
 Asteroids and comets rotation curves, CdR – Observatoire de Genève, Raoul Behrend
 
 
 

001862
Discoveries by Karl Wilhelm Reinmuth
Named minor planets
001862
001862
Earth-crossing asteroids
Venus-crossing asteroids
001862
001862
19320424